Indoor archery was contested at the 2009 Asian Indoor Games in Hải Phòng, Vietnam from 3 November to 6 November 2009. The competition took place at Hải Phòng Youth Gymnasium.

Medalists

Recurve

Compound

Medal table

Results

Recurve

Men's individual

Elimination
3 November

Knockout round

Men's team

Elimination
3 November

Knockout round
6 November

Women's individual

Elimination
3 November

Knockout round

Women's team

Elimination
3 November

Knockout round
6 November

Compound

Men's individual

Elimination
3 November

Knockout round

Men's team

Elimination
3 November

Knockout round
6 November

Women's individual

Elimination
3 November

Knockout round

Women's team

Elimination
3 November

Knockout round
6 November

References 
 Official site

2009 Asian Indoor Games events
Asian Indoor Games